Philippe Geluck (born 7 May 1954 in Belgium) is a  Belgian comedian, humorist, television writer  and cartoonist, who sold more than 14 million albums worldwide. He studied at the INSAS (Institut National Supérieur des Arts du Spectacle, National Higher Institute of the Arts of Spectacle). His best-known work is the comic strip Le Chat (The Cat), which is one of the ten bestselling Franco-Belgian comics series.

Geluck created Le Chat in 1983, for publication in the daily newspaper Le Soir. By 1987, the strip is published in multiple newspapers and the first album in what will become a long series is put in print. In the 2000s, Le Chat went global, being translated into several languages and reproduced beyond French-speaking regions, such as the United States and Iran.

While drawing Le Chat, Geluck also published other albums and series: Le Fils du Chat, Docteur G, Encyclopédies Universelles, Les Aventures de Scott Leblanc, Geluck se lâche.

Geluck is also a theatre actor, and well known to the French-speaking public as a television personality, with his own shows (Lollipop, L’esprit de famille, La Semaine infernale, Le Jeu des dictionnaire) and as co-host with Laurent Ruquier and Michel Drucker.

In addition to having received other honours, King Albert II of Belgium made him a Commander of the Order of the Crown (Belgium) in 2009.

References

External links
 

1954 births
Living people
Belgian editorial cartoonists
Belgian male comedians
Belgian comics artists
Belgian television writers
Male television writers

Commanders of the Order of the Crown (Belgium)